Batman Forever: The Arcade Game is a beat 'em up video game based on the movie Batman Forever. The subtitle is used to differentiate it from Batman Forever, another beat 'em up published by Acclaim at around the same time. One or two players, playing as Batman and Robin, fight Two-Face, the Riddler, and numerous henchmen.

Gameplay

Taking on the role of either Batman or Robin, players can punch, kick, and use special combination attacks to defeat waves of enemies.

The special combinations applied to enemies can add up to a possible 150+ hits on a single villain.

Special weapons, such as Batarangs, can be found throughout the levels. It is sectioned off into stages, and arranged with waves of enemies before ending with a boss.

The game has a two-player mode, which allows both players to use the same character if so desired.

Development 
Acclaim first demonstrated the game at the 1996 American Coin Machine Exposition. Batman Forever: The Arcade Game was Acclaim Entertainment's first arcade game. It was built on Sega's "Titan" technology, the hardware which formed the foundation for the Sega 32X and Sega Saturn. Even though the arcade version was only released in America, it can also run on Japanese and European Titan systems.

Prior to the release of the arcade and home versions, an Atari Jaguar CD port was in development by Probe Entertainment after Atari Corporation and Acclaim announced their partnership in 1995 that included plans to release three titles for the system, but Batman Forever: The Arcade Game was later licensed to Atari Corp. a few months later after the announcement of the partnership and was going to be based upon the PlayStation version that was also in development at the time. The port was originally slated to be published around the third quarter of 1995 and was later rescheduled for an April/Q1 1996 release, but work on the port was discontinued sometime in 1995 and was never released.

Reception

Reviewing the arcade version, a Next Generation critic praised the large selection of elaborate moves and combos, likening it to the Street Fighter series in this respect, as well as the use of sprite scaling to enable a wider range of movement and deeper gameplay, but still argued that the game lacks sufficient innovation to save the aging 2D beat 'em up genre. He also criticized the predictable level design and the gloomy graphics, saying they make it difficult to follow the action.

The Saturn conversion received mediocre reviews. Criticisms widely varied from review to review, but the most commonly cited problems were that the gameplay is too repetitive and the character graphics are blocky. Critics mostly assessed the game on its own terms rather than its quality as a conversion, though a Next Generation critic noted that the Saturn version is missing frames of animation from the arcade version. He summarized the game, and beat 'em ups in general, as "All flash, and absolutely zero substance." Lee Nutter of Sega Saturn Magazine called it "a poor man's Guardian Heroes, except that it is actually quite expensive." GameSpots Glenn Rubenstein and Electronic Gaming Monthlys Shawn Smith and Dan Hsu were somewhat more positive, remarking that while the game is objectively weak, its sheer loudness and chaotic energy are not without a certain charm. GamePro, while having little but criticism for the game, said that fans of side-scrolling beat 'em ups should try the game as a rental, since the genre had largely died out by the time of the game's release.

In a feature on the game, Electronic Gaming Monthly stated that the Saturn and PlayStation versions are identical aside from minor cosmetic differences, such as differing loading screens and the PlayStation version lacking the Batmobile intro's screen blurring effect. GamePros review of the PlayStation version said it was a faithful conversion, but that the fun of the arcade version simply does not translate to the home console experience.

References

External links 
 Batman Forever: The Arcade Game at GameFAQs
 Batman Forever: The Arcade Game at Giant Bomb
 Batman Forever: The Arcade Game at IMDb
 Batman Forever: The Arcade Game at Killer List of Videogames
 Batman Forever: The Arcade Game at MobyGames
 Batman Forever: The Arcade Game can be played for free in the browser on the Internet Archive

1996 video games
Acclaim Entertainment games
Arcade video games
Video games based on Batman films
Batman (1989 film series)
Beat 'em ups
Cancelled Atari Jaguar games
Cooperative video games
DOS games
Multiplayer and single-player video games
PlayStation (console) games
Sega Saturn games
Side-scrolling beat 'em ups
Superhero video games
Video games based on films
Video games based on adaptations
Video games with pre-rendered 3D graphics
Video games set in the United States
Video games developed in the United States